Ananda Aradhanai is a 1987 Indian Tamil-language film written and directed by Dinesh Baboo and produced by D. S. Prasad. It stars Mohan, Suhasini and Lissy. The film was released on 27 March 1987.

Plot 

A dance master(Mohan) falls in love with a young woman (Lissy) and their marriage is fixed. However, he meets with an accident that leaves him paralysed, making his fiance abandon him. Then nurse Stella (Suhasini) takes care of him.

Cast 
Mohan
Suhasini
Lissy
Senthil
Kovai Sarala
Thyagu
Charle
Srividya

Soundtrack 
Soundtrack was composed by Manoj–Gyan.

Reception 
N. Krishnaswamy of The Indian Express called it "Good, despite flaws".

References

External links 
 

1980s Tamil-language films
1987 films
Films directed by Dinesh Baboo
Films scored by Manoj–Gyan